Gasoleros is an Argentine telenovela issued between 1998 and 1999 by Canal 13. It aired at 9:00 p.m. during prime time, Monday through Friday. It was produced by Pol-ka and the original idea was from Adrián Suar. The musical theme of the introduction is Gasolero from Vicentico.

Plot 
The story is based on the daily life of the Panigasi family, an impoverished middle class family. The father of the family is Héctor Panigassi (Juan Leyrado), a former bus collector who became a mechanic, who has a workshop with family and friends. Roxana Presutti (Mercedes Morán), a woman married to a man she thinks she loves, Jorge Martínez Olmos, until she meets Héctor. Emilia (Silvia Montanari), it is another central character in the plot, which has a bar that she got with a lot of effort, place in which many of the stories emerged throughout the series will occur.

Cast

Protagonists 
 Juan Leyrado as Héctor Melchor Panigassi
 Mercedes Morán as Roxana María Presutti 
 Silvia Montanari as Emilia Nieto 
 Pablo Rago as Bonzo
 Dady Brieva as Alberto "Tucho" Regüeyo

Co-protagonists 
 Nicolás Cabré as Alejo Felman Presutti
 Manuel Callau as Jorge Martínez Olmos
 Cecilia Milone as Isabel Panigassi

Recurring cast 
 Héctor Bidonde as Benito Carrasco 
 Alejandro Fiore as Juan Carlos "Vikingo" Eguía
 Melina Petriella as Valeria Martínez Olmos 
 Mariano Martínez as Diego Lázaro 
 Verónica Llinás as Alicia "Chula" Rivarola 
 China Zorrilla as Matilde Arévalo de Presutti
 Nicolás Pauls as Sebastián
 Jimena Barón as Betina
 Valeria Bertuccelli as Elbita
 Rubén Rada as Liber
 Malena Solda as Luciana Nieto 
 Matías Santoianni as Darío Panigassi 
 Yaco González as Palo Santich 
 María Fiorentino as Felicidad García 
 Fabián Mazzei as Marcelo Gutiérrez 
 Pamela Rodríguez as Sandra Nieto 
 Luciano Leyrado as Javier
 Matias Camisani as Esteban
 Favio Posca as Bambi

Participations 
 Víctor Laplace as Gustavo Piccolo
 Carlos Roffé as Elías Fortunatto
 Martín Seefeld as Martín Ferreyra
 Carola Reyna as Andrea Nuñez
 Patricia Castell as Irma Olmos
 Enrique Morales as Carlos Martínez Olmos
 Alejandra Da Passano as Berta Rosenthal
 Martín Adjemián as Gregorio Rosenthal
 Héctor Anglada as Rubén Benítez
 Carina Zampini as Vera Vázquez
 Cristina Banegas as Dr. Eva Belloso
 Juan Darthés as Pedro
 Gabriela Toscano as Graciela
 Claudia Fontán as Marina
 Coraje Ábalos as Juan
  as Nancy
 Érica Rivas as Paula
 Andrea Campbell as Verónica
 Julieta Díaz as Jimena
 Mercedes Scápola as Teresa
 Laura Miller as Gladys
 Vivian El Jaber as Dina
 Alejandro Lerner as Federico
 Martín Karpan as Rubén
 Juan Gil Navarro as Wolfrang
 Violeta Urtizberea as Milena
 Claudia Albertario as Tamara
 Diego Peretti Arturo
 Carmen Vallejo as Concepción
 Alejo García Pintos as Alvarito
 Mirta Busnelli as Ana Clara
 Mike Amigorena as Matías
 Luciano Cáceres as Nicolás
 Joaquín Furriel as Gerardo
 Adrián Yospe as Fabio
 Carlos Calvo as Rodolfo Rojas
 María Leal as Ana Salinas
 Héctor Calori as Sergio Felman
 Diana Lamas as Marisa Ramos
 Osvaldo Santoro as Mario "Turco" Abdala
 Rubén Ballester as Guillermo "Willy" García
 Mario Alarcón as Fernando Belloso
 Agustina Posse as Jessica Rosenthal
 Ricardo Puente as Ricardo Fortunatto
 Mercedes Funes as Claudia Ferreyra
 Carlos Bermejo as Eduardo Manfredi
 María Elena Sagrera as Dora Salinas
 Alejandra Gavilanes as Laura Márquez Gentile
 Noelia Noto as Andrea Carrasco
 Guadalupe Martínez Uría as María Etcheverry
 Ernesto Larrese as Horacio de Vicenci
 Camila Gotkin as Violeta Panigassi
 Sofía Palomino as Sandra Nieto 
 Miguel Dedovich as Horacio
 Max Berliner as Barzuc
 Sergio Surraco as Frankie
 Gabo Correa as Óscar 
 María Ibarreta as Alita
 Emilia Mazer as Elena
 Divina Gloria as Lorena
 Aníbal Silveyra as Mauro
 Claudia Flores as Julieta
 Marina Skell as Alicia
 Silvia Pérez as Karina
 Mariana Richaudeau as Sofía
 Jazmín Rodríguez as Mariana
 Maida Andrenacci as Antonella
 Anahí Martella as Silvia
 Emilio Bardi as José
 Rodrigo Aragón as Raúl
 Moro Anghileri as Paloma
 Diego Jalfen as Tomás
 Carlos Portaluppi as Gerardo
 Marcelo Cosentino as Ricardo
 Edgardo Moreira as Néstor
 Gabriel Lennb as Suca
 Isabel Spagnuolo as Marta
 Rubén Green as Walter
 Juan Vitali as Tulio
 César Vianco as Rodrigo
 Alex Benn as Agustín
 Mónica Santibáñez as Norma
 Sandra Ballesteros as Mónica
 Luciano Comte as Felipe
 Germán Liotto as Daniel
 Regina Lamm as Irene
 Boris Rubaja as Rafael
 Lucrecia Capello as Zulema
 Cira Caggiano as Mónica
 Mónica Gazpio as Leonor
 Luis Minces as Eusebio
 Carlos Moreno as Miguel
 Tina Serrano as Tití
 Inés Paz as Soledad
 Isabel Quinteros as Rita
 Eugenia Tobal as Fiona
 Gastón Domínguez as Diego
 Ana María Caso as Elsa
 Peto Menahem as Héctor
 Patricio Arellano as Ariel
 Agustín Palermo as Nicolás 
 Claudio Rissi as Willy
 Edda Díaz as Dora
 Edda Bustamante as Victoria
 Boy Olmi as Mauro
 Paulo Brunetti as Pablo
 Rita Terranova as Mónica
 Coni Marino as Cecilia
 Santiago Ríos as Alexis
 Alberto Busaid as Malvicino
 Antonio Ugo as Arditti
 Paula Martínez as Azucena
 Cecilia Labourt as Haydée
 Liliana Pécora as Nelly
 Fito Yanelli as Miguel
 Silvia Armoza as Nilda
 Francisco Fernández de Rosa as Hernán                                
 Nazarena Vélez as Gricelda
 Julián Marti as Bubi
 Ira Fronten as Shannon

References

External links 
 
 Información sobre Gasoleros en www.telewiki.com.ar

1998 telenovelas
Argentine telenovelas
1998 Argentine television series debuts
1999 Argentine television series endings
Spanish-language telenovelas
Pol-ka telenovelas